Canal Days is a marine heritage festival held in Port Colborne, Ontario, Canada. The festival has been held annually since it was started in 1979 by the Port Colborne Historical & Marine Museum.

Port Colborne is located on the north-east shore of Lake Erie, on the southern portion of the Niagara Peninsula, and is about 30 minutes drive from the US border at Buffalo, New York. The city is also the southern terminus of the Welland Canal, where ocean vessels pass through the downtown area on their way into the inner Great Lakes, or out to sea.

Canal Days began in 1979 as part of a larger regional celebration of the 150th anniversary of the opening of the First Welland Canal. That first celebration attracted 400 visitors to the Museum grounds where the festival was held, paying tribute to the Canal's impact on the community. In 1980 the Museum decided to continue with the festival, and it has grown larger each year since.

During Canal Days the downtown streets and lift-bridge are closed to traffic, giving way to vendors, buskers, food merchants, and many attractions. The festival provides a fully supervised Children's area featuring live entertainment, a carnival midway, and a live bird of prey and reptile exhibit. Tall Ships moored along the canal wall are open for exploration, and special cruises are available on these historic ships as well, including a day-long journey from Lake Ontario, through the canal locks.

At the Lock 8 viewing complex, the Hidden Treasures vending area features local crafters and artists, and the Port Colborne Historical and Marine Museum offers a glimpse into the city's rich past. West Street, which features many historic buildings dating back to the 19th century, plays host to the largest open-air vending area and outdoor food court, while Ontario's largest outdoor vintage car show and kite display can be observed throughout the festival at H.H. Knoll park.

Fans of big band music can enjoy Jazz on the Lawn at the Roselawn Centre for the Living Arts. Nightly concerts in the fully licensed Market Square are also a big part of the festival: Classic rock headliners, tribute bands, and local favorites provide something for every musical taste in this great outdoor venue.

The festival culminates with a boat parade along the Port Colborne canal corridor and a massive fireworks display over the water.

Past Bands

References

External links
Port Colborne
Port Colborne Economic and Tourism Development Corp.
Canal days homepage

Busking venues
Culture of the Regional Municipality of Niagara
Festivals in Ontario
Port Colborne
Tourist attractions in the Regional Municipality of Niagara